Leonard Proxauf (born 27 November 1995) is an Austrian actor, best known for his role as Martin in the film The White Ribbon.

Life and career
Proxauf was born in Berlin. His mother is Austrian actress and artist agent Katja Proxauf. He started filming at the age of 9. His first minor role was the character of young Behrendt in the 2006 film Lohn deiner Angst. Proxauf booked his first major role in 2006. He played Jonas Block in the 2006 film Nevermore. In 2008 he played the small role of Christian Buddenbrook (played as an adult by August Diehl) in the literary film The Buddenbrooks.

The previous peak in Proxauf's acting career was the role of the reverend's son Martin in Michael Haneke's historical drama The White Ribbon (2009). For the European co-production, which tells of mysterious incidents in a north German village on the eve of the First World War, the 14-year-old won the Young Artist Award.

Proxauf will be seen in spring 2011 in the German television (ZDF) crime series The Inspector and the Sea as the police inspector's son, Niklas. He will also appear in a television (ZDF) film Der Test. In 2011 Proxauf filmed a guest leading role in the German TV crime series Tatort, which was aired on German TV in April 2012 and a lead role in the movie  which will be released in autumn 2012.

Awards

Filmography

References

External links

1995 births
Living people
Austrian male film actors
Male actors from Berlin
Austrian male television actors